Tactic(s) or Tactical may refer to:

 Tactic (method), a conceptual action implemented as one or more specific tasks
 Military tactics, the disposition and maneuver of units on a particular sea or battlefield
 Chess tactics
 Political tactics
 TACTIC (military program), a U.S. military research program conducted by DARPA

Computer science
 TACTIC (web framework), a smart process application by Southpaw Technology

Geography
 Tactic, Guatemala, a municipality in the Alta Verapaz department

Entertainment
 Tactics, a dart game similar to cricket
 "Tactics", a 1995 song by The Yellow Monkey
 Tactics (album), a 1996 album by John Abercrombie
 Tactics (band), an Australian band
 Tactics (game), generally credited as the first board wargame
 Tactics (manga), a Japanese manga series
 Tactic (video game), a puzzle video game
 Tactics (video games studio), a Japanese visual novel studio
 Tactical (album), a 2011 album by World Under Blood

See also